The Escape is a 1944 Mexican historical adventure film directed by Norman Foster and starring Esther Fernandez, Ricardo Montalbán, and Carlos Orellana. It is based on the short story Boule de suif by Guy de Maupassant. The sets were designed by the art director José Rodríguez Granada. 

The film is set during the French Intervention in Mexico. As the Republican forces of Benito Juarez close in on Mexico City, a group of pro-Imperial supporters flee on a stagecoach to the port city of Veracruz. Following the plot of the Maupassant story, the French lieutenant (Montalbán) demands sex from one of the passengers, a young Mexican prostitute (Fernández), in exchange for allowing the stagecoach to continue its journey. He tries to court her while her fellow passengers pressure her to accept. The ending of the film departs from the Maupassant story and makes the leads fall in love to form a tragic romantic couple. 

The film reunited Esther Fernández and Ricardo Montalbán after the critical and commercial success of Santa (Norman Foster, 1943), another period literary adaptation in which Fernández starred as a prostitute. Some sources mistakenly claim that Fernández's success in The Escape got her a contract from the Hollywood studio Paramount Pictures. In fact, The Escape was not as successful as Santa and Fernández had already been under contract at Paramount in the early 1940s, though she didn't make any movies. Paramount reportedly rehired her to co-star in Two Years Before the Mast based on old screen tests, not her performance in The Escape.

Cast

References

Bibliography

External links
 

1944 films
1940s historical adventure films
Films based on Boule de Suif
Mexican historical adventure films
1940s Spanish-language films
Films set in Mexico
Films set in the 1860s
Second French intervention in Mexico films
Films directed by Norman Foster
Mexican black-and-white films
Films scored by Manuel Esperón
1940s Mexican films